Can't Slow Down ... When It's Live! is a live album by rock band Foreigner, released in 2010. It was recorded on March 16 the same year Nashville, Tennessee at the Ryman Auditorium except for the track "Can't Slow Down" recorded in Seebronn, Baden-Württemberg (Germany), on July 31, 2010.

Track listing

Disc 1
"Double Vision"
"Head Games"
"Cold as Ice"
"In Pieces"
"Blue Morning, Blue Day"
"Waiting for a Girl Like You"
"When It Comes to Love"
"Dirty White Boy"
"Starrider"

Disc 2
"Feels Like the First Time"
"Urgent"
"Juke Box Hero"
"Long, Long Way from Home"
"I Want to Know What Love Is"
"Hot Blooded"
"Can't Slow Down"

Personnel
adapted from 'Foreigner - Rockin' at the Ryman' media notes
Mick Jones - lead guitar, keys, backing vocals, lead vocal on "Starrider"
Kelly Hansen - lead and backing vocals, percussion
Jeff Pilson - bass, backing vocals
Tom Gimbel - guitars, saxophone, flute, backing vocals
Jason Sutter - drums, backing vocals
Michael Bluestein - keyboards, backing vocals

References

Foreigner (band) albums
2010 live albums